The 2010 Canadian Tour season ran from February to November and consisted of 11 tournaments. It was the 41st season of the Canadian Professional Golf Tour.

The season started with three events in Latin America (February to April), followed by seven events in Canada (June to August), and ending with one event in the United States (November). American Aaron Goldberg won the Order of Merit.

Schedule
The following table lists official events during the 2010 season.

Order of Merit
The Order of Merit was based on prize money won during the season, calculated in Canadian dollars.

Notes

References

External links
Official site

Canadian Tour
PGA Tour Canada